The Office of Economic Opportunity was the agency responsible for administering most of the War on Poverty programs created as part of United States President Lyndon B. Johnson's Great Society legislative agenda.  It was established in 1964 as an independent agency and renamed the Community Services Administration in 1975.  In 1981, it was moved into the Department of Health and Human Services as the Office of Community Services, with most of its programs continuing to operate.

History

Independent agency 
The office was created through the efforts of R. Sargent Shriver, who also served as its first director.  Programs such as VISTA, Job Corps, Community Action Program, and Head Start (though that program was later transferred to the Department of Health, Education and Welfare) were all administered by the OEO. It was established in 1964, but quickly became a target of both left-wing and right-wing critics of the War on Poverty.

President Richard Nixon's appointment of Howard Phillips as Acting Director of OEO in January 1973 touched off a national controversy culminating in a court case in the United States District Court for the District of Columbia (Williams v. Phillips, 482 F.2d 669) challenging the legality of Phillips' appointment.  The Court found Phillips's appointment to have been illegal because it failed to meet the statutory circumstances which enabled appointment of an interim director without Senate confirmation; this judgement was upheld on appeal.

President Nixon's attempt to impound appropriated funds for OEO was ruled unconstitutional by Judge William B. Jones on April 11, 1973, in a case brought by Local 2677, AFGE; West Central Missouri Rural Dev. Corp.; and the National Council of OEO Locals.

Reauthorization in 1975 changed the name to the Community Services Administration (CSA) but retained the agency's independent status.

Department of Health and Human Services 

On September 30, 1981, the Omnibus Reconciliation Act of 1981 transferred functions via the Community Services Block Grant to the states and a small staff in the Office of Community Services in the Deptartment of Health and Human Services (HHS) in Washington, and abolished the regional offices along with some 1000 jobs.  Most of the agency's programs continued to operate either by HHS or by other federal agencies.

In 1986, it became part of the HHS Family Support Administration, which in 1991 became the Administration for Children and Families.

Impact on Native Americans 
Native Americans in the United States were among the main beneficiaries of the Office of Economic Opportunity when it was first established. R. Sargent Shriver, then director of the OEO, contacted Dr. James Wilson in 1964 and asked if he would lead a department that solely concentrated on poverty within Indian Country.  Dr. Wilson accepted, and after taking the position, began to act as "small 'a' activist" and a "big 'M' Manipulator" to "manipulate the system" of federal government dealings with Native Americans so Indians would eventually gain more political power.  The OEO prided itself on flexibility and creativity and allowed Native American tribes to receive direct funding.  The key OEO institution was the community action program (CAP), bestowed with the unusually energetic congressional mission statement of "a program which mobilizes and utilizes resources... in an attack on poverty."  An unofficial allegiance with the National Congress of American Indians gave the OEO political clout that helped pass the CAPs, despite their bitter relationship with the Bureau of Indian Affairs.  Tribal CAPs dedicated the largest amount of funding to Head Start for preschoolers and home improvement.  Other areas of emphasis included educational development, legal services, health centers, and economic development. 

One of the greatest accomplishments of the OEO Indian effort took place in Navajo country.  The Rough Rock Demonstration School rose from the community's will to give its children education that both respected and integrated Navajo culture and prepared young people for dealings with the majority society.  The school was run by Navajo and it became the first wholly Native American–controlled school since the federal government took over the schools of the  Five Civilized Tribes of Indian Territory (now Oklahoma) in the late 19th century.   Rough Rock's success led directly to the creation of the Navajo Community College (now Diné College), the first modern tribal college, and a movement that in time expanded to more than thirty higher education institutions. 

The OEO projects injected Indian country with confidence and determination and brought many benefits, but the generalized gifts of leadership and tribal control proved equally enduring.  Although many problems were encountered along the way, more than a thousand Indian people, never before given the chance to assume major responsibilities, took the reins of OEO projects and then moved into leadership positions in the tribal councils, national and regional Indian organizations, and federal and state offices. Native Americans had finally been given the power to either succeed or fail. 

Although the Office of Economic Opportunity was abolished in 1981, its effects are still being felt today.  Its programs have been curtailed or scattered among other federal agencies, particularly the Department of Health and Human Services.  Many states have adopted an OEO that serves to increase the self-sufficiency of their citizens, strengthen their communities, and eliminate the causes and symptoms of poverty.

Directors, 1964–1981
R. Sargent Shriver 1964–1968
Bertrand Harding 1968–1969
Donald Rumsfeld 1969–1971
Frank C. Carlucci  1971–1972
Philip V. Sanchez 1972–1973
Howard Phillips (acting)  1973–1973
Arvin J. Arnett 1973–1974
Bert A. Gallegos 1974–1976
Samuel Martinez 1976–1977
Graciela Olivarez 1977–1981

Notes

Defunct agencies of the United States government
Great Society programs
United States federal Indian policy
1964 in economics
1964 establishments in the United States
1981 disestablishments in the United States